Hudson station is a train station in Hudson, New York.  Hudson serves a total of four different Amtrak trains, all of which have a southern terminus at Pennsylvania Station in New York City.  They consist of the Adirondack from Montreal, Quebec, Canada, the Empire Service from Niagara Falls, New York, the Ethan Allen Express from Rutland, VT, and the Maple Leaf from Toronto, Ontario, Canada.  Lake Shore Limited trains from Chicago served Hudson until April 4, 2009.

History 

Originally built in 1874 by the New York Central Railroad, it is the oldest continuously operated station in the state. Besides the Water Level Route, Hudson was also the terminus of the former Boston and Albany Railroad Hudson Branch, as well as another branch leading to Niverville on the B&A Main Line.

Passenger service at the station as well as across the nation was assumed by Amtrak in 1971. In the late 1980s, the parking lots on either side of the station were repaved. The next renovation took place between 1991 and 1992 with funds from New York State, after the renovations, the station had a grand re-opening. In the late 1990s, ridership at the Hudson station grew to the point that the city opened up an additional parking lot across the street. In 2009, the city created metered parking on Front Street due to the continuing demand. A task force recently studied the feasibility of raising the platform, a difficult task since north end of the platform is curved and an active freight siding lies near that side of the station.

Station layout

The station has two low-level paved island platforms. Northbound trains generally use Track 1 while southbound trains generally use Track 2. with both trains opening doors on the eastern side. The third track is a passing loop that merges into Track 1 on either side of the station. Passengers are required to wait east of the passing loop until the train arrives in the station. The station is wheelchair-accessible, with passengers reaching the train via a portable wheelchair lift.

References

External links

Hudson Amtrak Station (USA Rail Guide – Train Web)

Amtrak stations in New York (state)
Former New York Central Railroad stations
Station
Railway stations in Columbia County, New York
Railway stations in the United States opened in 1874